Clay Van Hook (born January 18, 1985) is an American baseball coach and former infielder, who is the current head baseball coach of the UT Arlington Mavericks. He played college baseball at Navarro College and Texas from 2004 to 2007.

Coaching career
On July 1, 2022, Van Hook was named the head coach of the UT Arlington Mavericks.

Head coaching record

References

Living people
1985 births
McNeese Cowboys baseball coaches
Navarro Bulldogs baseball players
Oklahoma Sooners baseball coaches
Rice Owls baseball coaches
Texas Longhorns baseball coaches
Texas Longhorns baseball players
UT Arlington Mavericks baseball coaches